Dighawa  was a village development committee in Saptari District in the Sagarmatha Zone of south-eastern Nepal. It is now a part of Rajbiraj Municipality Ward No. 10.

At the time of the 2011 Nepal census it had a population of 4,249.

Demographics:
People from different castes from Maithali communities (Madheshi) reside here. Castes like Yadav, Khatwe (Mandal), Chamar, Musahar, Bania (das), Teli, Muslims are found in significant numbers. Maithali is spoken by all.

References

Populated places in Saptari District
VDCs in Saptari District